Carlos Borja may refer to:

Carlos Borja (footballer, born 1956), Bolivian football midfielder
Carlos Borja (soccer, born 1988), American soccer defender
Carlos Borja (basketball) (1913–1992), Mexican basketball player
Carlos Castro Borja (born 1967), Salvadoran football player